Shirley Palmer is the name of:
 Shirley Palmer (physician) (1786–1852), English physician and medical writer
 Shirley Palmer (actress) (1908–2000), American film actress
 Shirley Palmer (Kansas politician), Democratic member of the Kansas House of Representatives

See also
 Shirley W. Palmer-Ball (1930–2012), Republican in the U.S. state of Kentucky